Silene banksia (syn. Silene sieboldii) is a species of flowering plant in the family Caryophyllaceae. It is native to southeastern Siberia, most of China, and North Korea, and it has been introduced to Mongolia and Japan. The species goes by the common names Chinese lychnis and jian chun luo. It is a cultigen, domesticated in northeast Asia (almost certainly in China) at some time on the distant past. No wild individuals are known.

References

banksia
Garden plants of Asia
Flora of Siberia
Flora of China
Flora of North Korea
Plants described in 1999